Pamiątkowo railway station is a railway station serving the village of Pamiątkowo, in the Greater Poland Voivodeship, Poland. The station is located on the Poznań–Szczecin railway. The train services are operated by Przewozy Regionalne.

Train services
The station is served by the following service(s):

Regional services (R) Szczecin - Stargard - Dobiegniew - Krzyz - Wronki - Poznan

References

 This article is based upon a translation of the Polish language version as of November 2016.

Railway stations in Greater Poland Voivodeship